Laizhou or Lai Prefecture was a zhou (prefecture) in imperial China, centering on modern Laizhou, Shandong, China. It existed (intermittently) from 585 until 1376.

The modern city Laizhou, created in 1988, retains its name.

Geography
The administrative region of Lai Prefecture in the Tang dynasty is in modern northeastern Shandong. It probably includes parts of modern: 
Under the administration of Yantai:
Laizhou
Laiyang
Haiyang
Under the administration of Qingdao:
Jimo
Pingdu
Laixi

See also
Donglai Commandery
Laizhou Prefecture

References
 

Prefectures of Later Han (Five Dynasties)
Prefectures of the Tang dynasty
Prefectures of the Sui dynasty
Prefectures of Later Tang
Prefectures of Later Liang (Five Dynasties)
Prefectures of Later Jin (Five Dynasties)
Prefectures of the Song dynasty
Former prefectures in Shandong
Prefectures of Later Zhou
Prefectures of the Jin dynasty (1115–1234)
Prefectures of the Yuan dynasty